George Richard Hill III (November 24, 1921 – April 22, 2001) was an American chemist and a world authority on coal. Hill was also a general authority of the Church of Jesus Christ of Latter-day Saints (LDS Church) from 1987 to 1992.

Early life
Hill was born in Ogden, Utah to George R. Hill, Jr. and Elizabeth McKay. Both his parents were college deans at Utah State University. Hill's uncle was David O. McKay, ninth president of the LDS Church.

Professional career
Hill earned a degree in chemistry from Brigham Young University (BYU) and went on to earn a doctorate at Cornell University in 1946. In 1951, the University of Utah invited Hill to start the school's Department of Fuels Engineering. From 1966 to 1972, Hill also served as the dean of the College of Mines and Mineral Industries at the University of Utah. In 1972, he was appointed the head of the Office of Coal Research in the United States Department of the Interior. Among other things while in this position Hill oversaw attempts to create plants converting coal into natural gas. His general focus was on trying to find alternative energy sources in the face of rising gas prices. In 1977, he returned to the University of Utah as the Envirotech Professor of Chemical Engineering. Hill published over one hundred papers in academic journals and was the recipient of the Henry H. Storch Award from by the American Chemical Society. He also received an honorary doctorate degree from BYU. Hill was a member of the National Academy of Engineering beginning in 1989.

LDS Church service
In the LDS Church, prior to his call as a general authority, Hill was a bishop three times and a regional representative. From 1967 to 1971, Hill was a member of the general superintendency of the church's Young Men's Mutual Improvement Association, where he served under G. Carlos Smith and W. Jay Eldredge. In 1987, he became a member of the church's First Quorum of the Seventy. In 1989, he was transferred into the newly created Second Quorum of the Seventy, and held this position until he was released in 1992. During his tenure, Hill served in the presidencies of the church's Philippines/Micronesia and Utah South areas.

Personal life
Hill had a lifelong involvement with the Boy Scouts of America and was awarded the Silver Buffalo Award from the Boy Scouts. He has also received the Silver Beaver and Silver Antelope awards.

Hill was married to Melba Parker and was the father of seven children. He died of cancer in Salt Lake City.

See also
 Marvin J. Ashton
 George I. Cannon

References

 "Elder George Richard Hill III of the First Quorum of the Seventy", Ensign, May 1987, p. 88

External links
 Grampa Bill's G.A. Pages: George R. Hill III
 Kent Larson, George R. Hill III, former GA and Scientist, dead at 79, Mormon News, 2001-04-21.
 Deseret News obituary for Hill

1921 births
2001 deaths
20th-century American chemists
Latter Day Saints from Utah
Brigham Young University alumni
Cornell University alumni
Members of the First Quorum of the Seventy (LDS Church)
Members of the Second Quorum of the Seventy (LDS Church)
Counselors in the General Presidency of the Young Men (organization)
Heads of United States federal agencies
McKay family
Scientists from Ogden, Utah
University of Utah faculty
Regional representatives of the Twelve
Deaths from cancer in Utah
Latter Day Saints from New York (state)